Joaquim António de Aguiar (Coimbra, 24 August 1792 – Lisbon, 26 May 1884) was a Portuguese politician. He held several relevant political posts during the Portuguese constitutional monarchy, namely as leader of the Cartists and later of the Partido Regenerador. He was  three times prime minister of Portugal: between 1841 and 1842, in 1860 and finally from 1865 to 1868, when he entered a coalition with the Partido Progressista (English: Progressist Party), in what became known as the Governo de Fusão (English: Fusion Government).

He also served as minister of justice during the regency of Peter IV and in that capacity issued the 30 May 1834 law which extinguished "all convents, monasteries, colleges, hospices and any other houses of the regular religious orders". Their  vast patrimony was taken over by the Portuguese State and incorporated into the Fazenda Nacional (the National Exchequer). This law and its anti-ecclesiastical spirit earned Joaquim António de Aguiar the nickname "O Mata-Frades" (English: "The Friar-Killer").

See also
Dissolution of the monasteries in Portugal

References

External links 
Portugal – Dicionário Histórico, Corográfico, Heráldico, Biográfico, Bibliográfico,Numismático e Artístico Volume     I, págs. 94–95.

1792 births
1884 deaths
Prime Ministers of Portugal
Progressive Party (Portugal) politicians
People of the Liberal Wars
People from Coimbra
19th-century Portuguese politicians
Portuguese military personnel of the Napoleonic Wars
University of Coimbra alumni